MEVA Formwork Systems is a worldwide producer of formwork systems. Headquartered in Germany under the name MEVA Schalungs-System GmbH, the MEVA group has 40 subsidiaries, plants and logistics centers on 5 continents.

Business 
MEVA designs, constructs, produces and markets frame formwork systems for all types of in-situ concrete applications in the building industry. MEVA's product portfolio is completed by the company's service and consulting packages for formwork users.

History 

MEVA was founded in 1970 by Gerhard Dingler. The idea of developing a formwork system that would be re-usable led to the company's foundation and to the first frame-based panelised formwork system with a facing integrated into a metal frame, the so-called formwork panel. The panels are produced in different sizes and can be freely combined, hence the name modular formwork system. In the course of its history, MEVA developed several innovations, part of which have become standard features in the industry.

The milestones:
1971 – MEVA presents the first modular panelised formwork system.
1977 – MEVA invents the formwork clamp that connects panels tightly and firmly.
1978 – The frame with hollow profiles and grooves is presented. It is lighter than previous frames, supports a higher fresh concrete pressure and is easier to clean as no dirt can enter the closed hollow profiles.
1981 – The first crane-independent formwork system for walls and slabs is marketed.
1982 – MEVA's Mammut wall formwork system is the first heavy-duty system offering a fresh concrete load capacity of 97 kN/m2.
1989 – MEVA develops the aluminium wall formwork system.
1992 – The crane-independent MevaDec slab system offers 3 methods for all types of slabs.
2000 – MEVA presents the first all-plastic facing and is the first formwork producer to use this kind of facing in all formwork systems. Contrary to wooden facing, the all-plastic facing lasts as long as the panel frame, can be cleaned with high-pressure cleaners and repaired with identical material on the construction site and delivers a consistently high-quality concrete surface. MEVA's all-plastic facing alkus  comes with a 7-year long-term warranty that so far has never been claimed.
2012 – MEVA's automatic climbing system MAC is used on sites in Europe after several years of use in Australia and the Far East.
2016 - MEVA Mammut XT with flexible single and two-sided anchoring without additional attachments

Product and Service Portfolio

MEVA offers standard formwork systems for all types of in-situ concrete applications and also designs and produces special formwork and solutions for special requirements such as irregular building geometries or surfaces without joints. MEVA offers:

Crane-independent wall formwork systems with aluminum frames
Crane-dependent wall formwork for large-size heavy-duty applications
Support frames for single-sided wall applications
formwork systems for columns and curved walls 
Slab formwork systems 
Safety systems and equipment, e.g. wall formwork systems with integrated platforms and ladder access, folding, pouring and safety-catch platforms, shoring and stair towers
Climbing formwork: climbing scaffold, automatic climbing system, guided screens and climbing systems

Projects

MEVA formwork is used for all types of in-situ concrete work on construction sites all over the world:

Architectural construction
University of Economics and Business, Vienna, Austria
Football Stadium Pancho Arena, Felcsút/Hungary

Civil engineering construction
Football Stadium Pancho Arena, Felcsút/Hungary
JVA Augsburg/Germany
Linth–Limmern Power Stations, Linthal/Swiss
Sorenga Tunnel, Oslo/Norway
Stuttgart Trade Fair, Stuttgart, Germany
Stadionul Naţional, Bucharest, Romania
Victoria Square, Shopping Centre, Belfast, Northern Ireland
Loch Katrine freshwater reservoir, Glasgow, Scotland
Metro M4, Budapest, Hungary
Saint Petersburg Dam, Saint Petersburg, Russia

High-rise construction
Burj Khalifa, Dubai, UAE, The world's tallest building; 818 m (2,684 ft)
Hoffmann-La Roche, Basel, Swiss tallest building
Marina 101, Dubai, UAE
The Federation Tower, Moscow, Russia. Europe's tallest office building; 506 m (1,660 ft)
Q1 (building) 323 m (1,058 ft), Gold Coast, Queensland, Australia
Palais Royale, Mumbai, India
Lilian Tower in Dubai, UAE
The Jazz Residences in Manila, Philippines

Commercial and residential construction
Hoffmann-La Roche, Basel, Swiss tallest building
Battersea (Residential complex with 866 apartments at Battersea Power Station in London/UK)
University of Economics and Business, Vienna, Austria
Marina 101, Dubai, UAE
Football Stadium Pancho Arena, Felcsút/Hungary
Sorenga Tunnel, Oslo/Norway
Worcester Technical High School, Worcester, Massachusetts US
Loch Katrine freshwater reservoir, Glasgow, Scotland
Moorburg Power Station, Hamburg, Germany
Ohio University park garage, Athens, Ohio US
Leipzig University, Leipzig, Germany
Metro M4, Budapest, Hungary
Restoration of the Königsbau, Stuttgart, Germany
Hazaa Bin Zayed Stadium, Al Ain, VAE
City of Dreams expansion, Macau

Footnotes

External links
Most Influential: Formwork Leader Rolf Spahr, MEVA Formwork Systems (ACI)

Construction and civil engineering companies of Germany
Concrete
Building engineering organizations
Construction and civil engineering companies established in 1970
German companies established in 1970